"Beautiful Day" is a song by U2.

Beautiful Day may also refer to:

Music

Albums
 清新美丽 Beautiful Day, a Q-Genz album from 2013
 A Beautiful Day, a 2002 live album by Andrew Hill

Songs
 "Beautiful Day" (3 Colours Red song), 1999
 "Beautiful Day" (Lead song), 2017
 "Beautiful Day" (Scott Weiland song), 2007
 "Beautiful Day", a 2008 song by Kerli on the album Love Is Dead
 "Beautiful Day", a 2014 song by Jamie Grace on her album, Ready to Fly
 "Beautiful Day", a 2015 song by Jon Bon Jovi from the compilation album Finding Neverland
 "Beautiful Day", a 2016 song by TheGoodPerry on his album, Burberry Perry

See also
 Ella Cara Deloria (1888-1971), also known as the Beautiful Day Woman (Ąnpétu Wašté Wįn), a Yankton Sioux educator, historian and novelist
 Beautiful Day Monster, a muppet
 Beautiful Days (disambiguation)
 It's a Beautiful Day (disambiguation)
 "Beautiful Day Without You", 2006 song by Röyksopp